Bert Casey (died 1903) was one of the most violent of the outlaws to operate out of Oklahoma Territory. He and his gang were responsible for several savage murders, including the eleven-year-old son of Dr. Zeno Beenblossum, Deputy U.S. Marshal Luther "Lute" Houston,  and Caddo County Sheriff Frank Smith and his deputy, George Beck. Belonging to Casey's gang at different times were Fred Hudson, Ed Lockett, Joe Mobley, George Moran, Bob Sims, and Pete Williams. James and Ben Hughes (father and son) also participated with the gang; although opinions differed as to whether they were members or employers. However, the Hughes ranch was Casey's hideout. Casey was finally stopped by two of his former gang members (Fred Hudson and Ed Lockett) who were given Deputy U.S. Marshall commissions and promised a pardon if they captured or killed Casey. They killed him. His body remained unclaimed and he was buried in the Boot Hill section of Summit View Cemetery in the territorial capitol of Guthrie.

Footnotes

Sources
Butler, Ken. Oklahoma Renegades: Their Deeds and Misdeeds. Pelican Publishing, 1997.

External links
The Hughes Ranch

Year of birth missing
1903 deaths
Outlaws of the American Old West
Criminals from Oklahoma